Two comparisons of web frameworks are available:

 Comparison of JavaScript-based web frameworks (front-end)
 Comparison of server-side web frameworks (back-end)